Geke van den Berg (born 11 June 1995) is a Dutch judoka.

She is the silver medallist of the 2019 Judo Grand Prix Tbilisi in the -63 kg category.

References

External links
 

1995 births
Living people
Dutch female judoka
People from Groesbeek
Sportspeople from Gelderland
21st-century Dutch women